Robert Stanley Nichols (born January 3, 1969) is an American association executive and former public official. He is currently the president and CEO of the American Bankers Association. He was previously president and CEO of the Financial Services Forum from 2005 to 2015 and an assistant secretary at the U.S. Treasury Department during the George W. Bush administration.

Early life, education and career
Nichols was born in Camden, New Jersey, in 1969. He was raised in Seattle and moved to Washington, D.C., to attend George Washington University. He is a Sigma Alpha Epsilon Alumni Association member.

After graduation in 1991, he worked in the White House in the George H. W. Bush administration and served as an aide to then-Transportation Secretary Andy Card. After the Bush administration ended, Nichols held positions with the Washington state Republican Party; as a senior aide for the late Rep. Jennifer Dunn and former Sen. Slade Gorton. In 1995, he married his wife, Rebecca, whom he met at GWU. They have two children.

Treasury Department
In early 2001, Nichols was named deputy assistant Treasury secretary for public affairs in the George W. Bush administration, serving as the Treasury Department's spokesman. In April 2003, Bush nominated Nichols as assistant secretary for public affairs. He was confirmed in August 2003 and sworn in by Treasury Secretary John Snow. As assistant secretary, Nichols oversaw all public affairs for the department and led efforts to educate the American people about tax and currency policy, debt management, Social Security and Medicare financing, and international issues that impact the U.S. economy. Nichols is a recipient of the Alexander Hamilton Award, the highest honor of the Department of the Treasury.

Financial Services Forum
In 2005, Nichols was hand-picked to lead the non-partisan Financial Services Forum, which was at the time located in New York City. The forum represents 18 CEOs of America's largest financial firms, including banks, insurers, and asset managers. Nichols relocated the organization to Washington, D.C., and worked to raise its profile, educating the public about the importance of robust capital markets, encouraging a competitive global marketplace, and shaping the national and international regulatory dialogue.

Time referred to the forum as "perhaps the country's most powerful trade association," Nichols is frequently cited by the news media on capital markets and financial services issues. He was regularly quoted in publications such as The Wall Street Journal, The Washington Post, and The New York Times, and frequently appears on CNBC, Fox Business Network and Bloomberg. He has testified on several occasions before the House Committee on Financial Services and the Senate Committee on Banking, Housing and Urban Affairs, two key congressional committees that oversee the financial services industry.

From 2009 to 2014, Nichols was recognized by The Hill newspaper as one of the most effective trade association leaders in Washington, D.C. The New York Times called Nichols "among the most powerful lobbyists in Washington," in 2011. In November 2011, Nichols was included on The New Republic's list of Washington's most powerful, least famous people. In 2010, CEO UPDATE also named Nichols one of the year’s top trade association leaders.

While he represented large financial institutions, Nichols also expressed concern for smaller community banks. In 2013, he wrote an op-ed for Politico stating:
.
During Nichols' tenure, the forum also co-chaired Engage China, a coalition of 12 financial trade associations pushing for greater access to Chinese markets for overseas firms and more financial liberalization in Chinese markets.

American Bankers Association
In May 2015, Nichols was named president and CEO of the American Bankers Association, the nation’s largest trade group representing banks of all sizes. During his tenure as CEO, several bills and regulatory proposals supported by ABA have been enacted, including the Tax Cuts and Jobs Act of 2017 and the first major banking reform bill since the Dodd-Frank Act, the bipartisan Economic Growth, Regulatory Relief, and Consumer Protection Act (S. 2155). In 2019, Nichols was a vocal advocate for the SAFE Banking Act, which would allow banks to serve the cannabis industry. With ABA’s support, the legislation was passed by the House with a bipartisan vote in September 2019. Since Nichols’ arrival at ABA, the association’s push for “tailored regulation” and other refinements to the post-financial crisis regulatory framework has seen traction at regulatory agencies such as the Federal Reserve, FDIC, OCC and CFPB.

Nichols also reorganized ABA’s political engagement strategy, with the association producing ads endorsing congressional candidates for the first time—both Republicans and Democrats—and increasing its political activity in the 2020 campaign cycle. “Our goal is to support candidates who understand and appreciate the critical role banks of all sizes play in the economy,” Nichols said, according to the Wall Street Journal. “We plan to expand our efforts in 2020 on a rigorously bipartisan basis.” He made several key executive hires at ABA, including former managing director at JPMorgan Chase Naomi Camper as chief policy officer, former director for Freddie Mac’s single-family business Alethia Baggett as chief human resources officer, and former Pentagon press secretary Peter Cook as chief communications officer. The Washington Post has cited Nichols as one of a “new generation of trade group CEOs” taking an unconventional approach to lobbying to remake the image of trade associations. Nichols has also been regularly named one of the "Top Lobbyists" by The Hill, most recently in 2022. Nichols was also named to Washingtonian magazine's 2022 list of the 500 most influential people in Washington, which recognized him for "work[ing] to remove the IRS reporting provision from the House version of the Build Back Better plan."

In November 2016, the association announced a new student debt repayment benefit for employees, something offered by only 4% of U.S. employers at that time. In 2018, ABA was recognized as a "Great Place to Work" by the company that produces Fortune magazine’s 100 Best Companies to Work For list.

Nichols also announced ABA efforts to help banks innovate, including the association’s first direct investments in fintech companies. At ABA’s annual convention in 2018, he challenged large core processing firms to improve the services they provide to community banks, especially when it comes to implementing mobile banking, real-time payments and other services customers are demanding. As CEO, Nichols has increased participation of women in the ranks of ABA’s officers and executive staff. Within his first four years at the association, ABA elected the second and third women to chair the association in its 145-year history. As of 2019, the association had a female chief human resources officer, chief policy officer, general counsel, chief financial officer and senior adviser, five out of the association’s nine C-suite executive staff.

Philanthropy
Nichols is former vice chairman and a current board of governors member of Food Allergy Research and Education, a nonprofit group that supports scientific research and allergy-related advocacy. FARE helped support the School Access to Emergency Epinephrine Act, which was signed in 2013.

External links
American Bankers Association bio

References

Living people
George Washington University alumni
1969 births
American lobbyists
United States Assistant Secretaries of the Treasury